Brian Farrell may refer to:

 Brian Farrell (broadcaster) (1929–2014), Irish author, journalist, academic and broadcaster
 Brian Farrell (Gaelic footballer), Gaelic footballer from County Meath, Ireland
 Brian Farrell (ice hockey) (born 1972), retired American ice hockey player
 Brian Farrell (bishop) (born 1944), Roman Catholic bishop
 Brian D. Farrell, professor of biology and curator in entomology
 Brian Farrell (lacrosse) (born 1988), lacrosse player